Gilli Davies is a Cordon Bleu cook from Wales. Davies has been involved with food, food journalism and broadcasting since about 1975.

Background

At the age of 19, Davies ran her own bistro in Oxford. Davies has also run a restaurant in Berlin and an organic food restaurant in Cardiff and now lives in York.

Writing

Davies has written numerous cookery books based on Welsh cuisine, Cypriot cuisine and organic food.

In October 2015 Graffeg published the Flavours of Wales, a collection of five pocket books, each with over 20 recipes on Welsh cuisine.

Television

In 1990, Davies wrote and presented a 10 part television series called Tastes of Wales

Other work

Davies has run children's cookery classes, a training scheme to encourage restaurants to use local ingredients and a variety of other food events. Davies has been an advisor to the Food Standards Agency and is also a member and former chairwoman of the Guild of Food Writers.

Bibliography

Books by Gilli Davies include:

A Taste of Cyprus, Interworld Publications, 1998. 
A Taste of Wales, Pavilion Books, 1995. 
Celtic Cuisine, Graffeg, 2008. 
Cook Organic, Metro Books, London, 1998. 
The down to earth cookbook, British Gas Wales, 1993. 
Eat Well in Wales, Western Mail & Echo Ltd., 1998. 
Lamb, Leeks and Laverbread, Grafton, 1989. 
The Joy of Organic Cookery, Metro Books, London, 2002. 
The Very Best Flavours of Wales, Gwasg Gomer, 1997. 
The Welsh Calendar Cookbook, Y Lolfa Cyf., 2014. 
Flavours of Wales: Vegetarian dishes, Graffeg, 2015. 
Flavours of Wales: Fish and seafood, Graffeg, 2015. 
Flavours of Wales: Puddings and baking, Graffeg, 2015. 
Flavours of Wales: Starters and light dishes, Graffeg, 2015. 
Flavours of Wales: Meat, poultry and game, Graffeg, 2015.

Video links

The Flavours of Wales Series by Gilli Davies
Top Recipe Tips by Gilli Davies

References

See also
Laverbread

Year of birth missing (living people)
Living people
People from the Vale of Glamorgan
Welsh chefs
British television chefs